Victor Crivoi didn't try to defend his 2008 title.
Qualifier Federico del Bonis became the new champion, after defeating another qualifier Leonardo Tavares 6–1, 6–3 in the final.

Seeds

Draw

Final four

Top half

Bottom half

References
 Main Draw
 Qualifying Draw

Antonio Savoldi-Marco Co – Trofeo Dimmidisi – Singles
Antonio Savoldi–Marco Cò – Trofeo Dimmidisì